Yordan Bozov (Bulgarian: Йордан Бозов, born 25 January 1979) is a former Bulgarian professional basketball player, who last played for Rilski Sportist. Bozov has represented the national team of his country.

References

1979 births
Living people
BC Balkan Botevgrad players
BC CSKA Sofia players
BC Levski Sofia players
BC Rilski Sportist players
Bulgarian men's basketball players
Basketball players from Sofia
Guards (basketball)